Lutz Eigendorf (16 July 1956  – 7 March 1983) was a German professional footballer who played as a midfielder.

East German career
Eigendorf was born in Brandenburg an der Havel in East Germany. He began playing football for BSG Motor Süd Brandenburg in 1964, enrolled in the elite Children and Youth Sports School (KJS) "Werner Seelenbinder" in Alt-Hohenschönhausen in Berlin in 1970 and joined the youth academy of BFC Dynamo the same year. Eigendorf proved to be a very talented player and made his professional debut for BFC Dynamo in 1974. He made 100 East German top-flight appearances.

International career
He made his debut for the East Germany national football team in an August 1978 match against Bulgaria, immediately scoring his first two goals in a 2–2 draw. He went on to collect six caps, scoring three goals. His final international was a February 1979 friendly match against Iraq.

Defection to the West
BFC Dynamo travelled to West Germany to play a friendly match against 1. FC Kaiserslautern on 20 March 1979. The team made a visit to the city of Gießen the day after the match, on their return trip to East Berlin. During their visit, Lutz Eigendorf managed to escape from the rest of the team. He jumped into a taxi without money and fled back to Kaiserslautern. The destination was the offices of 1. FC Kaiserslautern. Eigendorf had thereby defected to the West, hoping to play for the football team. But because of his defection he was banned from playing for one year by UEFA and instead spent that time as a youth coach with the club.

This was not the first time an East German athlete had fled to the west, but it was a particularly embarrassing defection. Eigendorf's club BFC Dynamo was under the patronage of the Stasi, East Germany's secretive state police, and subject to the personal attentions of the organisation's head, Erich Mielke. After his defection Eigendorf openly criticised East Germany in the western media.

His wife Gabriele remained behind in Berlin with their daughter and was placed under constant police surveillance. Lawyers working for the Stasi quickly arranged a divorce and Gabriele Eigendorf remarried. Her new husband was eventually revealed as a Romeo agent codenamed Lothario. A Romeo agent was an agent of the state police whose role it was to spy on a suspect while romancing them.

Death under suspicious circumstances
In 1983, Eigendorf moved from Kaiserslautern to join Eintracht Braunschweig, all the while under the scrutiny of the Stasi who employed a number of West Germans as informants. On 5 March of that year, he was badly injured in a suspicious traffic accident in which he had driven his car into a tree. Apparently, a large truck had blinded him by turning on its main headlights just as Eigendorf was approaching a curve. He died at the hospital within two days. An autopsy indicated a high blood alcohol level despite the testimony of people he had met with that evening which indicated that Eigendorf had only drunk a small amount of beer. The police ruled the case an accident and Eigendorf was buried without autopsy.

Investigation into suspected assassination
After German re-unification and the subsequent opening of the files of the former East Germany's state security service, the public prosecutor's office in Berlin started an investigation into the possible murder of Lutz Eigendorf by the Stasi, but in 2004, the case was closed, and in 2011, despite public pressure, it was not reopened as the public prosecutor's office did not see any objective evidence of any third-party involvement and the suspicion of a contract killing could not be corroborated, leaving the case unsolved. A summary report of the events surrounding Eigendorf's death was made on German television on 22 March 2000 which detailed an investigation by Heribert Schwan in the documentary Tod dem Verräter (Death to the Traitor). A former East German spy alleged in 2010 that the Stasi ordered him to kill Eigendorf, which he personally claimed not to have done. However, the murder thesis that an angry Erich Mielke arranged to have Eigendorf killed is based on speculation, rather than hard facts.

References

Gallery

External links
 
 
 The curious case of Lutz Eigendorf – Part 1 – writer: Uli Hesse, from ESPN Soccernet
 The curious case of Lutz Eigendorf – Part 2 – writer: Uli Hesse, from ESPN Soccernet

See also
 List of Eastern Bloc defectors

1956 births
1983 deaths
Sportspeople from Brandenburg an der Havel
Footballers from Brandenburg
East German defectors
East German footballers
East Germany international footballers
German footballers
Association football midfielders
Berliner FC Dynamo players
1. FC Kaiserslautern players
Eintracht Braunschweig players
Bundesliga players
Assassinated dissidents 
Assassinated German people
Road incident deaths in Germany
DDR-Oberliga players
Death conspiracy theories